Marcia Baker is a retired professor known for her research on cloud physics which informs global climate models and defines the processes leading to the formation of lightning from clouds.

Education and career 

Baker graduated in 1955 from Urbana High School in Illinois. She earned a scholarship on the basis of "scholastic achievement and promise of effective participation and leadership" to attend Cornell University from which she earned a B.S. in 1959. She earned an M.S. from Stanford University in 1960 and a Ph.D. in physics in 1971 from the University of Washington. She remained at the University of Washington following her Ph.D., initially as a research associate. She was promoted to professor of geophysics and atmospheric sciences in 1988. She retired in 2004

Research 
Baker's research on cloud physics informs climate change models. Her early research examined how atmospheric particles absorb energy and the formation of droplets within cumulus clouds. Her modeling of turbulent mixing within clouds and the connections between cloud thickness and precipitation play a role in modeling of global climate. She has also used a combination of modeling and satellite observations to establish the processes that lead to the formation of lightning.

Selected publications

Awards and honors 
 Fellow, American Geophysical Union
 Fellow, American Meteorological Society
 Fellow, Royal Meteorological Society

References 

Fellows of the American Geophysical Union
Fellows of the American Meteorological Society
Cornell University alumni
Stanford University alumni
University of Washington alumni
University of Washington faculty
Atmospheric scientists
1938 births
Living people